Weslen Júnior Faustino de Melo (born 12 November 1999) is a Brazilian professional footballer who plays as a forward for Finnish club Seinäjoen Jalkapallokerho.

Club career
He was loaned to Armenian Premier League side Ararat Yerevan in 2019 and he signed with NB I side Puskás Akadémia in 2020.

Career statistics
.

References

External links
 Weslen Júnior at playmakerstats.com (English version of ogol.com.br)

1999 births
Living people
Brazilian footballers
Association football forwards
FC Ararat Yerevan players
Puskás Akadémia FC players
Puskás Akadémia FC II players
Armenian Premier League players
Nemzeti Bajnokság I players
Nemzeti Bajnokság III players
Brazilian expatriate footballers
Expatriate footballers in Armenia
Brazilian expatriate sportspeople in Armenia
Expatriate footballers in Hungary
Brazilian expatriate sportspeople in Hungary